Shelter House is a historic home located in Emmaus, Pennsylvania. Constructed in 1734, it is believed to be the oldest continuously occupied building structure in both Lehigh County and the Lehigh Valley and among the oldest still-standing building structures in the U.S. state of Pennsylvania.

History 
The first floor was built around 1734. In 1741, a three-room second story and a two-story annex were added. The house was built by early Pennsylvania German settlers and is a medieval-type Germanic log house made out of oak and chestnut and measuring approximately 40 feet by 25 feet. Mud, straw, and horse hair were used as the filling, or chinking, in between the gaps in the log walls, providing protection and insulation from outside elements. It has a gable roof and large, square stone chimney.

The Shelter House got its name from the German word "zufluchtshaus," meaning "house of refuge or shelter." The House is situated in a clearing of woods along a well-traveled Indian path and often served as a stopover for travelers. The house was inhabited at a time when there existed conflicts in the area between  American settlers and British colonialists and Native Americans. Many years later after the founding of Emmaus in 1759, the House became a hostel and tavern for wayfarers.

In 1952, the cabin was purchased at a public sale by a group of preservationists who raised $35,000 to stabilize and restore the structure and its grounds. In 1963, the Borough of Emmaus assumed ownership of the property, while the Shelter House Society continues with the responsibility of maintenance and preservation.

In 1978, it was added to the National Register of Historic Places.

References

External links
Official website

Emmaus, Pennsylvania
Houses completed in 1741
Houses in Lehigh County, Pennsylvania
Houses on the National Register of Historic Places in Pennsylvania
Log buildings and structures on the National Register of Historic Places in Pennsylvania
National Register of Historic Places in Lehigh County, Pennsylvania